Helperby is a village and former civil parish, now in the parish of Brafferton and Helperby, in the Hambleton District of North Yorkshire, England, about five miles west of Easingwold. Over the years it has joined onto Brafferton. On 1 April 2019 the parish was merged with Brafferton to form "Brafferton and Helperby".

Helperby has the Millennium Village Hall, a butcher's shop, a doctor's surgery and a mobile bakery and post office (open only on specific days).   There are two pubs, one a restaurant with rooms, one a village inn, and a disused Methodist Chapel which is now a house. In 2008 Helperby had a new pavilion at the football and cricket pitch. There is also a war memorial, in memory of war soldiers in World War One

There is also an annual beer festival held in September to raise funds for future development of a Children's play area.

The film The Life and Crimes of William Palmer was filmed in the village in 1998.

There is now a Children's play area, located outside the Millennium Village Hall, next to the post office.

In 2022 a Wedding Event venue was opened, located on the outskirts of Helperby.

Governance
An electoral ward in the same name exists. This ward had a total population of 1,922 at the Census 2011.

References

External links

Villages in North Yorkshire
Former civil parishes in North Yorkshire
Hambleton District